Walter Watson (November 1890 – 1956) was an English footballer who played as a winger for Worksop Town, Aston Villa, Rotherham Town, Kilmarnock, and Chesterfield Town.

Career
Watson joined Aston Villa from Worksop Town in March 1912. He played three First Division matches in the 1911–12 campaign, and left to join Rotherham Town in July 1913. He later played for Kilmarnock, and Chesterfield Town. He scored three goals in sixteen Midland Football League matches for Chesterfield in the 1914–15 season, but was suspended after twice missing trains to get to games on time. During World War I he served in the York and Lancaster Regiment and would suffer from shell shock. He also played as a guest for Port Vale in a 1–0 defeat to Manchester City in a wartime league match at the Old Recreation Ground on 19 April 1919. After the war he rejoined Worksop Town, before returning to Kilmarnock for the 1921–22 and 1922–23 seasons.

Career statistics

References

1890 births
1956 deaths
Footballers from Sheffield
English footballers
Association football wingers
Worksop Town F.C. players
Aston Villa F.C. players
Rotherham Town F.C. (1899) players
Kilmarnock F.C. players
Chesterfield F.C. players
Port Vale F.C. wartime guest players
English Football League players
Midland Football League players
Scottish Football League players
British Army personnel of World War I
York and Lancaster Regiment soldiers